Cnoc na Toinne (Irish for "hill of the wave"), at , is the 17th-highest peak in Ireland on the Arderin list, and the 23rd-highest peak in Ireland on the Vandeleur-Lynam list. It is part of the MacGillycuddy's Reeks range in County Kerry.  Cnoc na Toinne lies between the Coomloughra Reeks and the Eastern Reeks, and is just above the col of the Devil's Ladder, a popular route for climbing Carrauntoohil, Ireland's highest mountain.

Geography

Cnoc na Toinne is most frequently encountered as the minor summit that forms the col with Carrauntoohil, through which most hill walkers travel on their way summiting Ireland's highest mountain.  The col is most commonly accessed from the Hag's Glen (via Cronin's Yard), by ascending a loose rocky path known as the Devil's Ladder (see photo opposite).

Because of the deterioration of the Devil's Ladder path, hill walkers also use the Zig-Zag path on the northern side of the north-west spur of Cnoc na Toinne, known as Bóthar na Gíge, as an alternative route.  This path brings walkers closer to the actual summit of Cnoc na Toinne.

Cnoc na Toinne lies between the Coomloughra Reeks and the Eastern Reeks and effectively separates the two main sections of the MacGillycuddy Reeks range, each section containing half of the Reeks summits that are above 3,000 ft in height.  The north-easterly ridge that rises up from the top of the Devil's Ladder col to Cnoc na Toinne, then rises further to neighbouring Cnoc an Chuillinn , where is runs in a straight north-easterly direction, taking in several major summits, connected by a high sharp ridge, before ending at Cruach Mhór .

Cnoc na Toinne is the 798th-highest mountain in Britain and Ireland on the Simm classification. Cnoc na Toinne's prominence qualifies it to meet the Arderin classification, and the British Isles Simm and Hewitt classifications.

Notes

References

See also 

 Lists of mountains in Ireland
 List of mountains of the British Isles by height
 List of Furth mountains in the British Isles

External links
MountainViews: The Irish Mountain Website, Cnoc na Toinne
MountainViews: Irish Online Mountain Database
The Database of British and Irish Hills , the largest database of British Isles mountains ("DoBIH")
Hill Bagging UK & Ireland, the searchable interface for the DoBIH
Ordnance Survey Ireland ("OSI") Online Map Viewer
Logainm: Placenames Database of Ireland

Mountains and hills of County Kerry
Mountains under 1000 metres